The Fair Credit Reporting Act (FCRA), 15 U.S.C. § 1681 et seq., is federal legislation enacted to promote the accuracy, fairness, and privacy of consumer information contained in the files of consumer reporting agencies. It was intended to shield consumers from the willful and/or negligent inclusion of erroneous data in their credit reports. To that end, the FCRA regulates the collection, dissemination, and use of consumer information, including consumer credit information. Together with the Fair Debt Collection Practices Act (FDCPA), the FCRA forms the foundation of consumer rights law in the United States. It was originally passed in 1970, and is enforced by the U.S. Federal Trade Commission, the Consumer Financial Protection Bureau, and private litigants.

History
Before standardization of credit scoring, statements of character were integral to credit reports well into the 1960s. With credit reports containing probing details about personality, habits, and health, in the hearings on the Fair Credit Reporting Act lawmakers were troubled that individuals were helpless to clear up errors. 

It was written as an amendment to add a title VI to the Consumer Credit Protection Act, .

The Fair Credit Reporting Act was one of the first data privacy laws passed in the Information Age. The findings of the U.S. Congress that led to the Act and the Act's regulatory goals set the direction of information privacy in the U.S. and the world for the next sixty years. Among these innovations were the determination that there should be no secret databases to make decisions about a person's life, individuals should have a right to see and challenge the information held in such databases, and that information in such a database should expire after a reasonable amount of time.

Consumer reports 
Commonly referred to as credit reports, a consumer report "contains information about your credit—and some bill repayment history—and the status of your credit accounts. This information includes how often you make your payments on time, how much credit you have, how much credit you have available, how much credit you are using, and whether a debt or bill collector is collecting on money you owe. Credit reports also can contain rental repayment information if you are a property renter. It also can contain public records such as liens, judgments, and bankruptcies that provide insight into your financial status and obligations."

Inaccuracies in consumer reports 
A 2015 study released by the Federal Trade Commission found that 23% of consumers identified inaccurate information in their credit reports.  Under the Fair and Accurate Credit Transactions Act (FACTA), an amendment to the FCRA passed in 2003, consumers are able to receive a free copy of their consumer report from each credit reporting agency once a year. The free report can be requested by telephone, mail, or through the government-authorized website: annualcreditreport.com.

Civil liability 
The FCRA regulates: 
  Consumer reporting agencies; 
  Users of consumer reports; and, 
  Furnishers of consumer information.

If a consumer's rights under the FCRA are violated, they can recover: 
 Actual or statutory damages; 
  Attorney's fees; 
  Court costs; and, 
  Punitive damages if the violation was willful.  "The threat of punitive damages under 1681n of the FCRA is the primary factor deterring erroneous reporting by the reporting industry."

The statute of limitations requires consumers to file suit prior to the earlier of: two years after the violation is discovered; or,
five years after the violation occurred.

Consumer attorneys often take these cases on a contingency fee basis because the statute allows a consumer to recover attorney's fees from the offending party.

Users of consumer reports
Users of the information for credit, insurance, or employment purposes (including background checks) have the following responsibilities under the FCRA:

 Users can only obtain consumer reports for permissible purposes under the FCRA;
 Users must notify the consumer when an adverse action is taken on the basis of such reports; and,
 Users must identify the company that provided the report, so that the accuracy and completeness of the report may be verified or contested by the consumer.

Employment background checks
Employers using consumer reports to screen job applicants or employees must follow specific procedures: 
 Get your written permission; 
 Tell you how they want to use your credit report; 
 Not misuse your information;
 Give you a copy of your credit report if the employer decides not to hire or fires you; and,
 Give you an opportunity to dispute the information contained within your credit report before making a final adverse decision.

Furnishers of information 
A creditor, as defined by the FCRA, is a company that furnishes information to consumer reporting agencies. Typically, these are creditors, with which a consumer has some sort of credit agreement (such as credit card companies, auto finance companies and mortgage banking institutions).

Other examples of information furnishers are collection agencies (third-party collectors), state or municipal courts reporting a judgment of some kind, past and present employers and bonders. Lenders have an important role to play in ensuring credit reports are accurate. Under the FCRA, creditors who furnish information about consumers to consumer reporting agencies must:

 Provide complete and accurate information to the credit reporting agencies;
 Investigate consumer disputes received from credit reporting agencies;
 Correct, delete, or verify information within 30 days of receipt of a dispute; and,
 Inform consumers about negative information which is in the process of or has already been placed on a consumer's credit report within one month.

(This notice doesn't have to be sent as a separate notice, but may be placed on a consumer's monthly statement. If sent as part as the monthly statement, it needs to be conspicuous, but need not be in bold type. Required wording developed by the US Federal Treasury Department):

Notice before negative information is reported: We may report information about your account to credit bureaus. Late payments, missed payments, or other defaults on your account may be reflected in your credit report.

Notice after negative information is reported: We have told a credit bureau about a late payment, missed payment or other default on your account. This information may be reflected in your credit report.

Consumer reporting agencies (CRAs) 
Consumer reporting agencies (CRAs) are entities that collect and disseminate information about consumers to be used for credit evaluation and certain other purposes, including employment. Credit bureaus, a type of consumer reporting agency, hold a consumer's credit report in their databases. CRAs have a number of responsibilities under FCRA, including the following:

 CRAs must maintain reasonable procedures to ensure the maximum possible accuracy of the information contained within a consumer's report;
 Provide a consumer with information about him or her in the agency's files and take steps to verify the accuracy of information disputed by a consumer;
 If negative information is removed as a result of a consumer's dispute, it may not be reinserted without notifying the consumer in writing within five days; and,
 Remove negative information seven years after the date of first delinquency (except for bankruptcies (10 years) and tax liens (seven years from the time they are paid).

The three big CRAs—Experian, TransUnion, and Equifax—do not interact with information furnishers directly as a result of consumer disputes. They use a system called E-Oscar. In some areas of the country, however, there are other credit bureaus.

Nationwide specialty consumer reporting agencies
In addition to the three big CRAs, the FCRA also classifies dozens of other information technology companies as "nationwide specialty consumer reporting agencies" that produce individual consumer reports used to make credit determinations. Under Section 603 of the Fair Credit Reporting Act, the term "nationwide specialty consumer reporting agency" means a consumer reporting agency that compiles and maintains files on consumers on a nationwide basis relating to:
 Medical records or payments;
 Residential or tenant history;
 Check writing history;
 Employment history; or,
 Insurance claims.

Because these nationwide specialty consumer reporting agencies sell consumer credit report files, they are required to provide annual disclosures of their report files to any consumer who requests disclosure. A partial list of companies classified as nationwide specialty consumer reporting agencies under FCRA includes: Telecheck, ChoicePoint, Acxiom, Integrated Screening Partners, Innovis, the Insurance Services Office, Tenant Data Services, LexisNexis, Retail Equation, Central Credit, Teletrack, the MIB Group, United Health Group (Ingenix Division), and Milliman.

Although the major CRAs Experian, Equifax, and TransUnion are required by law to provide a central source website for consumers to request their reports, the nationwide specialty consumer reporting agencies are not required to provide a centralized online source for disclosure. The FCRA Section 612 merely requires nationwide specialty consumer reporting agencies to establish a streamlined process for consumers to request consumer reports, which shall include, at a minimum, the establishment by each such agency of a toll-free telephone number for such consumer disclosure requests.

See also

 Annualcreditreport.com
 Adverse Credit History
 Background check
 Credit card
 Credit history
 Credit rating agency
 Credit score
 Fair and Accurate Credit Transactions Act
 Fair Credit Billing Act
 Identity theft
 Identity Theft Resource Center
 Tenant Screening
 Financial privacy laws in the United States

References

External links
 As codified in 15 U.S.C. chapter 41 subchapter III of the United States Code from the LII
 As codified in 15 U.S.C. chapter 41 subchapter III of the United States Code from the US House of Representatives
 Consumer Credit Protection Act (FCRA is title VI; PDF/details) as amended in the GPO Statute Compilations collection
 FTC advisory opinions
 FTC Staff Opinion Letters archive 1997-2001
 MyMoney.gov from the US Financial Literacy and Education Commission
 Consumer Financial Protection Bureau (CFPB) maintains a consumer reporting company list current as of January 2020

 

United States federal banking legislation
Credit